Nijeholtpade is a village in Weststellingwerf in the province of Friesland, the Netherlands. It had a population of around 485 in 2017.

The village was first mentioned in 1399 as Nyeholepat, and means "new low-lying path". Nije (new) has been added to distinguish from Oldeholtpade. The Dutch Reformed church was built in 1525, and has a bell tower. The church was a replacement of a wooden church.

Nijeholtpade was home to 150 people in 1840.

References

External links

Geography of Weststellingwerf
Populated places in Friesland